Monster High: The Movie is a 2022 live-action musical fantasy film directed by Todd Holland, produced by the television division of Mattel and Brightlight Pictures, written by Jenny Jaffe, Greg Erb, and Jason Oremland, and starring Miia Harris, Ceci Balagot, and Nayah Damasen. In the United States, it was released on both Paramount+ and Nickelodeon on October 6, 2022. 

Based on the Monster High fashion doll franchise by Mattel, it is one of two projects announced on February 23, 2021, alongside an animated series as part of a second Monster High brand relaunch.

Plot
Clawdeen Wolf is a biracial half-werewolf girl, born from a human father named Apollo and a werewolf mother named Selena. On Clawdeen's 15th birthday, she receives an invitation to study at Monster High. Although reluctant, Apollo agrees to let her attend, on the condition that she hide her human side.

Upon arriving at Monster High, Clawdeen befriends Frankie Stein, a non-binary Frankenmonster with a brilliant mind, and falls in love with Deuce Gorgon, son of Medusa. She also meets Draculaura, daughter of Dracula; Cleo de Nile, Deuce's ex-girlfriend and daughter of the Mummy; Lagoona Blue, a Colombian sea monster; and zombie Ghoulia Yelps. The school's Headmistress Bloodgood invites Clawdeen to represent the students at a Monster High Council on the upcoming Founder's Day, to which she agrees.

Clawdeen discovers that she temporarily transforms into a human when she feels strong emotions, particularly around Deuce. During class, her professor Mr. Komos recounts the story of Edward "Eddy" Hyde, a former student and half-monster who was expelled when his human side was discovered, allowing him to be killed by hunters. Komos says that Hyde created a formula to transform himself into a full-blooded monster, but was never able to test it due to being killed before it can happen. Clawdeen decides to find and drink the formula.

Clawdeen's secret is discovered by Frankie. Instead of shunning her, they help her look for Hyde's lab in the school graveyard. There, they discover Draculaura practicing witchcraft which they promise to keep secret in exchange for her help. The group finds the lab, but it has a lock that only a certain hand can open.

Draculaura finds a spell that might unlock the lab, with ogre's bone as one of the ingredients. Clawdeen collects some from Bloodgood's mug and is nearly caught by Cleo, until Draculaura casts a spell to change Clawdeen's likeness. The next ingredient is snake's venom, which Clawdeen obtains from Deuce's hair; the two develop feelings for each other after gaining each other's trust. Later, Clawdeen, Frankie and Draculaura complete the spell, but are unable to unlock the lab and are caught by Bloodgood, Komos, and Cleo, the latter of whom told Bloodgood about Draculaura's magic practice. As the school starts to quake, Bloodgood realizes that there is an "untrue monster heart" somewhere among them.

The next day while feeling she's putting everyone at risk, Clawdeen leaves the school. Draculaura and Frankie find her and convince her to return, saying they will help her no matter what. On Founder's Day, the group discovers that Clawdeen's transformed human hand can open Hyde's lab; although the space appears to simply be an ogre's tomb, they find Hyde's lab and formula behind a hidden door. Clawdeen almost drinks the formula, but stops, reluctant about giving up her "other half". Suddenly, Mr. Komos appears, revealing he is also half-human and telling Clawdeen that giving up on yourself isn't the answer. When she gives him the formula, Komos drinks it instead, revealing that he is Hyde's son himself and that he seeks to avenge his father's death by destroying Monster High.

Komos transforms into a full-blooded monster with the ability to absorb a monster's powers, taking Draculaura's powers first. After locking Komos in the lab, Clawdeen, Frankie and Draculaura call Cleo for help, who arrives with Lagoona, Deuce, Ghoulia and Heath. Komos escapes and steals Deuce's powers next, transforming Deuce into stone; Clawdeen, heartbroken, transforms into a full human, much to the teenagers' shock. Clawdeen uses Cleo's phone to make Mr. Komos look at his own reflection, petrifying him and returning Draculaura and Deuce's powers. Bloodgood, Dracula, and the Monster High Council arrive in time to discover both Komos' intentions and Clawdeen's secret.

The next day, Apollo arrives to pick up Clawdeen so they can return to the human world. To both their surprise, Headmistress Bloodgood reveals that she's not expelling Clawdeen because of her "true monster heart" and Dracula states that the school's charter is being rewritten to acknowledge that not all humans are bad. The monsters welcome Clawdeen as their first official human-blooded student, Dracula allows Draculaura to practice witchcraft, and Deuce runs for student council. Clawdeen is celebrated by Dracula, Apollo, and all of the students.

In a pre-credits scene, in an unknown place, a witch watches through a crystal ball and instructs her minions to bring Draculaura to her, foreshadowing the events of Monster High 2.

Cast
The cast were announced as follows:

 Miia Harris as Clawdeen Wolf, daughter of the Werewolf and Apollo, and best friend to Frankie and Draculaura, and Deuce’s love interest. She is half-werewolf and half-human, and a bit sheltered since she was raised in the human world, but is very caring and cares deeply for her friends. At  the end of the movie after Monster High is saved, it is implied she begins a romance with Deuce.
 Ceci Balagot as Frankie Stein, child of Frankenstein and child of Dr. and Dr. Stein and best friend to Clawdeen and Draculaura. They are a Frankenmonster born just 15 days ago and assembled from some of the greatest geniuses in history, Frankie is Clawdeen's roommate. Unlike previous incarnations of the character, Frankie is non-binary and made of different male and female body parts like a brain made from the brain parts of Albert Einstein, Marie Curie, Plato, and a woman named Liz who was not given credit for apparently creating the Internet while their heart is from a fisherman.
 Nayah Damasen as Draculaura, daughter of Dracula and friend of Frankie Stein and Clawdeen Wolf. A bit of a rebel, she's obsessed with magic, specifically witchcraft, even though it's strictly forbidden.
 Jy Prishkulnik as Cleo de Nile, daughter of the Mummy, Deuce's ex-girlfriend, Lagoona's best friend, and Monster High's resident Queen Bee.
 Case Walker as Deuce Gorgon, son of Medusa and Lyra, Heath's best friend, Cleo's ex-boyfriend, and Clawdeen's love interest. Due to his gorgon powers, he is forced to wear glasses so he doesn't transform anyone into stone and hides his snakes under a hat so they don’t bite anyone. He does get his powers taken by Mr. Komos/Hyde and is turned to stone, much to Clawdeen's horror,  but is soon brought back to life after Hyde is defeated, and runs for student council at the end of the movie, and begins dating Clawdeen.
 Kyle Selig as Mr. Komos / Edward "Eddy" Hyde Jr., a half-monster and half-human with horns and Monster High's resident "cool teacher". Mr. Komos is incredibly trustworthy, and offers Clawdeen guidance and advice for how to fit in at Monster High. But he is revealed to be the son of half-human half-monster Edward "Eddy" Hyde who got killed by humans after being expelled from Monster High.
 Marci T. House as Headless Headmistress Bloodgood, the headless horsewoman who is Monster High's tough-but-fair headmistress and a stickler for following the rules.
 Scotch Ellis Loring as Apollo, a human who is Clawdeen's father. Unlike most humans, Apollo never had a bad opinion on monsters, he loves his daughter and wife very much, not caring for the fact the two are werewolves (Clawdeen half werewolf).
 Steve Valentine as Dracula, Draculaura's father, a friend of Bloodgood, and a member of Monster High Council. Dracula pressures Draculaura in order for her to become an excellent student, just like him, his father, grandfather and grand-grandfather were.
 Lina Lecompte as Lagoona Blue, daughter of the Sea Monster and a Sea Nymph. She is Cleo's best friend.
 Justin Derickson as Heath Burns, son of the Fire Elementals, Deuce's best friend, and Abbey's love-interest.
 Lilah Fitzgerald as Ghoulia Yelps, daughter of the Zombies. Unlike previous Monster High projects, Ghoulia actually speaks and doesn't limp around.
 Nasiv Sall as Abbey Bominable, the daughter of the Yeti and Heath's love-interest.
 Ajay Banks as Greigor
 Brian Dobson as Eye
 Natasha Leggero as Skullette
 Artemis Pebdani as Witch

Production

Background and context
Monster High is an American fashion doll franchise created by Garrett Sander for Mattel, with illustrations by Kellee Riley and Glen Hanson, and was launched on June 11, 2010. Initially consisting only of dolls and a web series, it soon expanded to also include other various consumer products mainly marketed towards children, such as other types of toys, clothing, accessories, books, comics, stationery and other forms of merchandise. Featuring characters inspired by monster movies, sci-fi horror, thriller fiction, folklore, mythology and popular culture, this franchise involves teenage children of famous monsters and creatures of which the principal list are Draculaura, Frankie Stein, Clawdeen Wolf, Cleo de Nile and Lagoona Blue attending a high school with the same name as the franchise itself. The first two film specials were animated in Flash by WildBrain Entertainment which later switched to CGI animation by Nerd Corps Entertainment in 2012 starting with Why Do Ghouls Fall in Love? and ending in 2016 with Great Scarrier Reef. The franchise was rebooted in 2016 with a reboot and origin story film special called Welcome to Monster High, using revamped face molds, upgraded animation technologies and techniques, which was not well received by critics and fans and led to its initial cancellation on February 9, 2018.

Before the announcement of the film, there was a previous attempt at making a live-action Monster High film in the brand's launch year of 2010. Universal Pictures (then Universal Studios) announced that a live-action, around-the-world musical adventure film would be directed by Ari Sandel, written by Craig Zadan, Neil Meron, Stephanie Savage and Josh Schwartz, with the latter two handling the screenplay and given a scheduled release date of October 7, 2016. Nothing was said since the announcement.

Development
On February 23, 2021, Mattel, through its television division, announced the second return of the Monster High brand, promising new content and products for the following year, including a new animated series and a live-action film based on the franchise, both of which will air on Nickelodeon in the United States. On November 9, 2021, the film's cast and director were revealed with the latter being Todd Holland (who directed 50 episodes of The Larry Sanders Show, 26 episodes of Malcolm in the Middle and the 1989 film The Wizard) and the former at time of announcement being Miia Harris as Clawdeen Wolf, Ceci Balagot as Frankie Stein and Nayah Damasen as Draculaura.

Promotion
On June 30, 2022, a trailer of Monster High: The Movie was uploaded to Nickelodeon's official YouTube channel.

Sequel
On October 25, 2022, a sequel titled Monster High: The Movie 2 was announced. Production began on February 7, 2023. It will premiere in 2023 on Nickelodeon and Paramount+.

Soundtrack

References

External links
 

Monster High
2022 films
2022 fantasy films
2022 horror films
2022 LGBT-related films
2020s American films
2020s Canadian films
2020s high school films
2020s musical films
Children's horror films
American supernatural horror films
2020s teen fantasy films
American high school films
American musical fantasy films
American teen LGBT-related films
American teen musical films
Canadian high school films
Canadian LGBT-related films
Canadian musical fantasy films
Films based on fashion dolls
Films about witchcraft
Films based on Mattel toys
Films directed by Todd Holland
LGBT-related musical films
Nickelodeon original films
Paramount+ original films
Transgender-related films